Koodevide? is a 1983 Malayalam-language drama film, written and directed by P. Padmarajan, starring Mammootty, Suhasini and Rahman, who makes his debut. The film is based on the Tamil novel Moongil Pookkal by Vasanthi. The film was Rahman's movie debut. The film was a major commercial success and was Padmarajan's first commercial hit.

Plot

Alice is a teacher at a boarding school in Ooty. A prodigal and unruly son of a Member of Parliament Xavier Puthooran, Ravi Puthooran  joins the school in Alice's class. Alice manages to mentor him into a good student. Alice's boyfriend Captain Thomas feels intensely jealous of the attention Alice shows upon Ravi Puthooran. He accidentally kills the boy and surrenders to the police, leaving Alice frustrated in all aspects of her life.

Cast
Suhasini as Alice
Mammootty as Captain Thomas
Rahman as  Ravi Puthooran
 Rejani Mohanan as Jaani
Jose Prakash as Xavier Puthooran
Manian Pillai Raju as Shankar
Prem Prakash as Captain George
Sukumari as Susan
Devi as Daisy
Kottayam Santha
Anjali Naidu as Rajamma

Soundtrack

Awards

Koodevide won three Kerala State Film Awards and eight Kerala Film Critics Association Awards. It was also selected for screening in that year's Indian Panorama.
Kerala State Film Awards
Best Film with Popular Appeal and Aesthetic Value
Kerala State Film Award for Second Best Actor – Rahman
Kerala State Film Award for Second Best Actress – Sukumari

Kerala Film Critics Association Awards
 Best Film
 Best Director – P. Padmarajan
 Best Actress – Suhasini
 Best Screenplay – P. Padmarajan
 Best Cinematographer – Shaji N. Karun
 Best Music Director – Johnson
 Best Lyricist – O. N. V. Kurup
 Best Female Playback Singer – S. Janaki

References

External links

1983 films
1980s Malayalam-language films
Films with screenplays by Padmarajan
Films directed by Padmarajan
Films based on Indian novels
Films scored by Johnson
Films shot in Ooty